Hamza Koudri (born December 15, 1987 in Mila, Algeria) is an Algerian footballer who plays as a midfielder for USM Alger in the Algerian Ligue Professionnelle 1.

Club career

MC Alger

USM Alger

On May 26, 2012, Hamza Koudri joined for two seasons coming from rivals MC Alger. and one of the reasons for his leaving is people in the club who spread rumors about him, He made his debut for the team in the Ligue 1 as a starter during a draw against CS Constantine 1–1, In his first season Koudri won two titles, the first the Algerian Cup against his former club MC Alger. and two weeks later, he won the UAFA Club Cup against Al-Arabi SC, in the second leg in which was received sent off after a dangerous intervention. In the second season Koudri won again two titles, the first in the Super Cup against ES Sétif for the first time. and at the end of the season he won the first Ligue 1 title with USM Alger and the second in its history. 

On November 1, 2014, Koudri scored his first goal with USM Alger since joining two years ago against MC El Eulma in a 2–1 win away from home. In the 2015 CAF Champions League, Koudri made the best continental achievement in his career when he reached the final and defeated his team against TP Mazembe. Koudri stated that lack of experience and poor choice of stadium were the reason behind the defeat and said it was his worst memory. in the same season Koudri won the league title for the second time. On November 8, 2016, Koudri renewed his contract for three years until 2020 after his previous contract had expired in June 2017, despite the problems that the player has suffered recently, in light of the brilliance of the young duo Raouf Benguit and Mohammed Benkhemassa.

In the 2018–19 season Koudri won his last title with USM Alger by winning the championship for the third time. In a season that was difficult due to the imprisonment of the club owner and the outbreak of protests in Algeria. On August 24, 2020, Hamza Koudri renewed for one season and is considered the best since joining the club, where he was the second best scorer with seven goals, including two doubles against NA Hussein Dey and RC Relizane. On November 20, 2022, in a match against US Biskra, Koudri sustained a serious injury which later became clear that he had cut the Cruciate ligament which would keep him away for the end of the season. 

On July 14, 2022, Koudri officially left with tears after the administration refused to renew his contract, after ten years with the club during which he won seven titles. Reda Abdouche general director stated that it's will be an adventure to rely on a player who suffered from an injury in Cruciate ligament that kept him out of the field for a year and at his age especially since he's at the end of his contract, Abdouche said that they will not abandon him and if he decides to enter the field of training they will help him.

International career
On April 5, 2008 he was called up by the Algeria A' National Team for a game against USM Blida on April 11. He featured in both of Algeria's games against Morocco in the 2009 African Champions of Nations qualifiers.

Career statistics

Club

Honours

Club
 USM Alger
 Algerian Ligue Professionnelle 1 (3): 2013-14, 2015-16, 2018–19
 Algerian Cup (1): 2013
 Algerian Super Cup (2): 2013, 2016
 UAFA Club Cup (1): 2013

 MC Alger
 Algerian Ligue Professionnelle 1 (1): 2009-10
 Algerian Super Cup (1): 2007

References

External links
 

 

1987 births
Algerian footballers
Living people
MC Alger players
People from Mila
Algerian Ligue Professionnelle 1 players
Algeria A' international footballers
USM Alger players
Algeria international footballers
Association football midfielders
21st-century Algerian people